Mersin İdmanyurdu (also Mersin İdman Yurdu, Mersin İY, or MİY) Sports Club; located in Mersin, east Mediterranean coast of Turkey in 1966-1967.  The 1966–67 season was the 3rd season of Mersin İdmanyurdu football team in Second League, the second level division in Turkey. The team became the champions of the league and promoted to 1967-68 Turkish First Football League at the end of the season.

The team's name was changed to Mersin İdmanyurdu from Çukurova İdmanyurdu which was the name adopted under Çukurova Group sponsorship. This decision was made in the congress of the club held on 15.06.1966. In the congress, following were elected for executive committee: Nevzat Emrealp, Mehmet Karamehmet, Halit Gazioğlu, Mahir Turhan, Mustafa Sözmen, Faruk Niskavi, Ünal Şıhman, Erol Tarhan, Sungur Baydur, Sezai Sak, Aydın Özlü. The committee declared that an amount of TL 500.000 was allocated for transfers and Sabri Kiraz was decided to be spoken with as manager of the football team. However, later, Lefter Küçükandonyadis has become the manager, famous former player of Fenerbahçe and Turkey national football team. In the mid-season Küçükandonyadis left his previous team Feriköy and started his manager career in MİY on 16.02.1967. He demanded that existing coach Fahrettin Cansever should also remain as trainer.

Executive committee at the beginning of the season had been consisted of: Nevzat Emrealp (president), Nail Turan (deputy president), Dr. Aydın Özlü (secretary), Sezai Sak (general captain), Sungur Baydur (accountant), Halil Gazioğlu, Ünal Şıhman (members).

Mersin İdmanyurdu has won the league title in Turkish Second Football League, 1966–67 season.  They finished the season in Red Group at first place. After season they won Second League Championship match against Bursaspor. As champions they were eligible to play Prime Minister's Cup (Chancellor Cup) against champions of the amateur leagues.

Pre-season
Spor–Toto Cup games:
 21.08.1966 - Adanaspor-MİY: 3–1. Sunday. Adana.
 28.08.1966 - Adana Demirspor-MİY: 0–0. Sunday. Adana.
 04.09.1966 - MİY-Kayserispor: 1–0. Sunday. Adana.

1966–67 Second League participation
Second League was played for the fourth time in 1966–67 season with 33 teams grouped in red (17) and white (16) groups. In each group top teams promoted to First League 1967–68 and last teams relegated to Third League 1967–68 formed that year. Mersin İY took place in Red Group and finished first. The most scorer player was Osman Arpacıoğlu with 23 goals. They won all the home games during the league.

Results summary
Mersin İdmanyurdu (MİY) 1966–67 Second League Red Group league summary:

Sources: 1966–67 Turkish Second Football League pages.

League table
The final league table of Red Group of Second League in 1966–67 season and results of games played by Mersin İY are provided in the following table.

Two points for a win. Rules for classification: 1) points; 2) goal difference; 3) number of goals scored. First team is MİY in both cases, home and away. Bye weeks are shown in team's raw.
(P): Promoted to 1967–68 Turkish First Football League; (R): Relegated to 1967–68 Turkish Third Football League. 
Source: 1966–67 Turkish Second Football League in Cem Pekin Archives; and in mackolik.com; and advanced searched performed in Milliyet online archive for 1966–67 Mersin İdmanyurdu season.

Results by round
Results of games MİY played in 1966–67 Second League Red Group by rounds:

First half

Second half

Championship match
Mersin İdmanyurdu won the second league championship against Bursaspor, the White Group's winner.

1966–67 Chancellor Cup
MİY has won the Chancellor Cup (also called Prime Minister's Cup) in 1967 (as champions of second league against İzmir Denizgücü, amateur league winner).

1966–67 Turkish Cup participation
The fifth Turkish Cup in 1966–67 was played as Türkiye Kupası by 81 teams: 17 from First league, 33 from Second league, 18 from regional leagues and 15 from amateurs. Three elimination rounds (including preliminary rounds) were played in one-leg elimination system at first team's grounds. QF, SF, and finals were played in two-leg elimination system. But starting from the previous Cup finals were played in single match if the finalist were from the same city. Two İzmir teams drew in the final match; and Altay won the fifth cup by casting lots after extra time against Göztepe and become eligible for ECW. Mersin İdmanyurdu participated in Turkish Cup (Türkiye Kupası) in 1966–67 and was eliminated at preliminary round 2 of round 3 by Gençlerbirliği.

Cup track
The drawings and results Mersin İdmanyurdu (MİY) followed in 1966–67 Turkish Cup are shown in the following table.

Note: In the above table 'Score' shows For and Against goals whether the match played at home or not.

Game details
Mersin İdmanyurdu (MİY) 1966–67 Turkish Cup game reports is shown in the following table.
Kick off times are in EET and EEST.

Source: 1966–67 Turkish Cup pages.

Management

Club management
Executive committee:
President: Nevzat Emrealp. Deputy President: Mahir Turan. General Secretary: Aydın Özlü. General Captain: Sezai Sak. Members: Halit Gazioğlu, Ünal Şıhman, Mustafa Sözmen, Faruk Miskavi, Erol Tarhan, Sungur Baydur, Sadettin Cömert.

Coaching team
Head Coach: Lefter Küçükandonyadis. Trainer: Fahrettin Cansever.

1966–67 Mersin İdmanyurdu head coaches:

Note: Only official games were included.

1966–67 squad
Stats are counted for 1966–67 Second League matches and 1966–67 Turkish Cup (Türkiye Kupası) matches. In the team rosters four substitutes were allowed to appear, two of whom were substitutable. Only the players who appeared in game rosters were included and listed in the order of appearance.

Sources: 1966–67 season squad data from maçkolik com, Milliyet, and Erbil (1975).

See also
 Football in Turkey
 1966–67 Turkish Second Football League
 1966–67 Turkish Cup

Notes and references

Mersin İdman Yurdu seasons
Turkish football clubs 1966–67 season